Vladimir Ivanov (born September 20, 1988, in Kyrgyz SSR, Soviet Union) is a Russian-American model who hails from what is now Kyrgyzstan. He is known for working with the Italian brand Dolce & Gabbana.

Career
He started his modeling career with JE Model Management in San Francisco. The same year he appeared at the fall issue of the Numéro Homme and then appeared in Macy's catalogue of the same year. In 2013 Nicola Trussardi have featured his face in one of his magazines and then in January he was seen on walks for such brands as Belstaff, Bottega Veneta, D&G, and for such fashion designers as Dean and Dan Caten and Frankie Morello in Milan, Italy. The same month he was photographed by Steven Meisel for Calvin Klein's jeans and then became the star of its commercial. In February 2009 he participated at the Z Zegna show in New York City and the same month was photographed by Milan Vukmirovic for the spring issue of L'Officiel Hommes. In March 2014 he appeared in Russian version of GQ magazine and in April of the same year was photographed by Kevin O'Brien for Details magazine.

The same month Karl Lagerfeld photographed Ivanov for VMAN magazine and in June Roberto Cavalli photographed him for D&G following by Chad Pitman who took him for VMAN again. In January 2010 he participated in Dolce & Gabbana fashion show in Milan, and then posed in swim trunks for Calvin Klein swimwear ad where for which he was photographed by Sebastian Kim. In spring of the same year Ivanov was featured for the Vogue Hommes International where he was photographed by Patrick Demarchelier and in June of the same year in Z Zegna, Louis Vuitton, and Dean and Dan Caten shows in both Milan and Paris respectively. In 2014 he was photographed by Kai Z. Feng for VMAN and in November 2014 posed for the W magazine by Steven Meisel following by another pose for the 2015 issue of Calvin Klein magazines featuring swimwear.

References

External links

Vladimir Ivanov on Tumblr
Vladimir Ivanov on Male Model Scene

1988 births
Living people
Russian male models
Russian emigrants to the United States